Twanna Angela Hines (born 1975) is an American writer, internet personality, and sex educator who also discusses human sexuality and relationships on her website Funky Brown Chick.

Biography  
Hines attended  Illinois State University, where she received a Bachelor of Science in Sociology, and Florida State University, where she received her Master of Science and she also completed post-graduate education at Universiteit van Amsterdam and New York University.

She appears on television, film, and radio programs including Spark (Canadian Broadcasting Corporation), Maximum Radio (Sirius Satellite Radio), and NPR. She was a sex columnist for Nerve, and is currently a syndicated sex columnist for Metro International.

Publications

Books: contributor
 'Six-Word Memoirs on Love and Heartbreak: by Writers Famous and Obscure', New York Times Best Seller, Harper Perennial, 2009, 
 'On purpose: Rhetorical Analysis of Non-fiction', Gyldendal Uddannelse, 2009, 
 'Migration and Immigration: A Global View, A World View of Social Issues', Greenwood Press, 2004,

Articles
Hines, Twanna A. (October 30, 2011). "Sex education in school saves lives". "The Journal News".
Hines, Twanna A. (December 10, 2010) 4 Tips to Spice Up Your Sex Life "BlogHer"
Hines, Twanna A. (July 13, 2010) Interview: Jillian Lauren, author of Some Girls: My Life in a Harem "SMITH" magazine.
Hines, Twanna A. (2010, 5 May)  Sex Bombs and Legalized Prostitution in Times Square "The Huffington Post".
Hines, Twanna A. and Moodie, Desiree (January 26, 2010) Do You Like To Have Sex During Your Period? "The Frisky"
Hines, Twanna A. (December 31, 2008) I'm a Writer, Not a Child Pornographer "The Huffington Post".
Hines, Twanna A. (November 6, 2008) Jean-Claude Van Damme Gets "Raw" in JCVD "The Huffington Post".
Hines, Twanna A. (October 30, 2008). "Take My Vibrator, Please!". "New York Press".
Hines, Twanna A. (October 24, 2008) Political Sex Scandals: Obama, McCain & Palin  "The Huffington Post".
Hines, Twanna A. (September 11, 2008) Top 5 Online Dating Site Trends "Mashable".
Hines, Twanna A. (August 19, 2008)  Freakonomics: Interracial Sex Makes Us More Beautiful  "The Huffington Post".
Hines, Twanna A. (February 13, 2008). "Is Facebook Helping or Hurting Your Love Life?". "Fast Company" magazine.
Hines, Twanna A.. "Don't Call Your Ex". "Lifetime".
Hines, Twanna A.. "How to Find a Sex Therapist and Your Orgasm". "The Stir".

References

External links 
 Official Website

1975 births
Living people
American women bloggers
American bloggers
American educators
American relationships and sexuality writers
American advice columnists
American women columnists
American sex columnists
Writers from Illinois
Sex educators
American women non-fiction writers
21st-century American non-fiction writers
21st-century American women writers
21st-century African-American women writers
21st-century African-American writers
20th-century African-American people
20th-century African-American women